The fourth season of the Brazilian competitive reality television series MasterChef Profissionais premiered on September 13 at 10:30 p.m. on Band.

Ana Paula Padrão returned as the host, while Érick Jacquin and Henrique Fogaça returned as judges. Paola Carosella left the show after three seasons and was replaced by Helena Rizzo.

Chef Diego Sacilotto won the competition over chef Thalyta Koller on November 8, 2022.

Contestants

Top 12

Elimination table

: Day 7 included an intermediary challenge. The winner of the challenge had a ten minute advantage in the elimination challenge.

Key

Ratings and reception

Brazilian ratings

All numbers are in points and provided by Kantar Ibope Media.

References

External links
 MasterChef Profissionais on Band

2022 Brazilian television seasons
MasterChef (Brazilian TV series)